Lament of the Holy Cross (Polish: Lament świętokrzyski) is a medieval Polish planctus, written by unknown author probably in late 15th century. It now is regarded as one of lyrical masterpieces of the era. Literary historians emphasize the fact that the Lament presents Mary almost as a human being, with feelings and emotions. Most likely, the text used to be part of the Good Friday mysterium. 

Lament of the Holy Cross is the monologue of Mary, who is painful and mourns her son Jesus Christ, standing under his cross. At first, she calls on people standing around her, urging them to show compassion and understanding. She then turns to her son, hoping to ease his sufferings and get closer to him. Later Mary gets angry and rebellious, and the text is completed with an appeal to all mothers to pray to God for their sons. 

The Lament comes from the Benedictine Monastery at Lysa Gora in the Holy Cross Mountains, and was probably written in ca. 1470.

See also 
 Old Polish language

Sources 
 Poezja polska XIV - XV wieku. W: Tadeusz Witczak: Literatura Średniowiecza. Warszawa: Polskie Wydawnictwo Naukowe, 2002

External links 
 Lament of the Holy Cross (polish)

Polish literature
History of Christianity in Poland
15th-century poems
Works of unknown authorship